Earl King, Ernest Ramsay, and Frank Conner were three merchant seamen convicted of murdering a ship's officer, George Alberts,  aboard a freighter anchored in Alameda, California, on March 22, 1936. Their trial, appeals, and terms in San Quentin Prison made up a widely reported case that caught the attention of trade unionists, progressives, and radicals. The actions were prosecuted by Alameda County District Attorney Earl Warren.

King was the secretary of the Marine Firemen's Union, Ramsay was a union organizer, and Conner was the engine-room union delegate aboard the steamship  Point Lobos, which was on a trip for Swayne & Hoyt's Pacific to Gulf Coast shipping lane and had crossed the Panama Canal on 7 March, heading for Seattle, Washington. Union activists accused the prosecution of engaging in an anti-union plot, alleging prejudice by the judge and other irregularities.

The three were not aboard the ship when the crime was committed. The actual assault was laid to a seaman named Sakovitz, whose first name was never revealed and who was never apprehended. Another sailor, George Wallace, admitted being aboard the ship with Sakovitz. Wallace admitted taking part in the crime and testified that Conner, who remained on the dock, had given a signal to begin the killing. Conner also confessed but he later attempted to repudiate his admission.  The prosecution accused Ramsay and King of planning the crime.

Governor Culbert Olson commuted the sentences of the trio to time served, and in 1953 Warren, who was then the outgoing governor of California, granted Ramsay a full pardon just hours before he left for Washington to take up his new duties as Chief Justice of the United States.

See also

 C.H. Garrigues, defense investigator

References

People convicted of murder by California
History of labor relations in the United States
Criminals of the San Francisco Bay Area
Seafarers International Union of North America
Labor movement in California
1936 crimes